State Route 57 (SR 57) is a primary state highway in the U.S. state of Virginia.  The state highway runs  from SR 8 near Woolwine east to SR 360 near Halifax.  SR 57 connects the independent city of Martinsville with Chatham and Halifax, the county seats of Pittsylvania and Halifax counties, respectively.  The state highway also connects the city to Fairy Stone State Park.

Route description

SR 57 begins at an intersection with SR 8 (Woolwine Highway), which heads south toward the Patrick County seat of Stuart and north toward Woolwine.  SR 57 heads northeast through a mountainous area of Patrick County just east of the Blue Ridge Mountains as Fairystone Park Highway.  The state highway curves southeast at its junction with SR 346 (Fairystone Lake Drive), which is the main entrance to Fairy Stone State Park.  SR 57 passes through the park property before entering Henry County.  The state highway begins to parallel the Smith River shortly before meeting the western end of SR 57 Alternate (Riverside Drive), where the mainline highway crosses to the north side of the river and parallels Norfolk Southern Railway's Winston-Salem District through the community of Bassett, within which the highway has a tight S-curve to cross to the north side of the tracks.

SR 57 veers away from the railroad and expands to a four-lane divided highway through Stanleytown to a cloverleaf interchange with U.S. Route 220 (US 220, William F. Stone Highway).  The roadway continues east as US 220 Business (Virginia Avenue).  SR 57 joins US 220 south for a short concurrency before splitting from US 220 at a partial interchange that only allows access to SR 57's new road, two-lane Appalachian Drive, from the north.  SR 57 parallels the Smith River and the rail line again past Fieldale, where the highway crosses to the south side of the track.  Just after passing the WHEE radio tower, the state highway enters the city of Martinsville, its name changes to Fayette Street, and the road curves northeast under the railroad track toward downtown.  SR 57 heads toward a five-way intersection where the highway intersects US 220 Business (Memorial Boulevard) and SR 457, which follows two-way Church Street eastbound and two-way Fayette Street westbound through the area west of downtown Martinsville.

SR 57 turns south onto US 220 Business, a five-lane road with center turn lane that passes under the rail line again.  At Starling Avenue, US 220 Business continues south along Memorial Drive with US 58 Business while US 58's business route joins SR 57 on two-lane Starling Avenue.  SR 57 and US 58 Business pass the Virginia Museum of Natural History before turning east onto Church Street, which veers northeast, expands to a four-lane road, and crosses over the Dick & Willie Passage Rail Trail.  At Chatham Heights Road, the two highways head east as a four-lane divided highway whose name changes to A.L. Philpott Highway when it leaves the city of Martinsville.  A short distance east of the city limits, SR 57 turns northeast onto Chatham Road, which intersects the eastern end of SR 457 (Old Chaham Road), crosses several forks of Leatherwood Creek, and passes to the south of Turkeycock Mountain.

SR 57 becomes Callands Road on entering Pittsylvania County.  The state highway meets the northern end of SR 41 (Franklin Turnpike) at Callands south of Brier Mountain.  SR 57 crosses the Banister River and passes through the hamlets of Rondo and Hollywood on its way to the Pittsylvania County seat of Chatham.  The state highway enters the town by crossing Cherrystone Creek and becomes Depot Street, which passes under Norfolk Southern's Durham District rail line.  Near the Pittsylvania County Courthouse, SR 57 joins US 29 Business on a short concurrency along Main Street.  The state highway leaves the town on Halifax Road, which passes to the south of Chatham Hall and has a diamond interchange with US 29.  SR 57 crosses the Banister River again and passes along the northern edge of White Oak Mountain.  The state highway passes through the hamlets of Shockoe, Lucks, Ebenezer, and Peytonsburg before entering Halifax County, where the highway becomes Chatham Road.  SR 57 curves south and crosses Sandy Creek just west of its mouth at the Banister River before reaching its eastern terminus at SR 360 (Mountain Road) west of Halifax.

Major intersections

SR 57 Alternate

SR 57 Alternate (SR 57 Alt., signed as SR 57A) is a  alternate route of SR 57 between an intersection with SR 57 in Bassett to an interchange with US 220 near Fieldale. At SR 57 Alt.'s western terminus, SR 57 crosses the Smith River and stays on its eastern bank while SR 57 Alt. remains on the west side throughout its entire route. From Bassett, the route travels southeast on Riverside Drive mostly through small residential neighborhoods. After passing the T.B. Stanley Highway (Secondary Route 903), SR 57 Alt. enters a more commercialized area and intersects the entrance driveway to the Bassett High School. At Great Road, the road's name changes to River Road. About  later, SR 57 Alt. ends at a diamond interchange with the US 220 freeway that bypasses Martinsville. River Road continues southeast as Secondary Route 682 towards Fieldale.

References

External links

Virginia Highways Project: VA 57

057
State Route 057
State Route 057
State Route 057
State Route 057
State Route 057